This table displays the top-rated primetime television series of the 2007–08 season as measured by Nielsen Media Research.

References

2007 in American television
2008 in American television
2007-related lists
2008-related lists
Lists of American television series